Bishwodip Lingden Limbu is a Nepalese politician, belonging to the Nepali Congress. In the 2008 Nepalese Constituent Assembly election, he won the Jhapa-7 seat in the Constituent Assembly election with 16099 votes defeating his nearest rival KP Sharma Oli.

Electoral history

2008 Nepalese Constituent Assembly election

References

Year of birth missing (living people)
Living people
Communist Party of Nepal (Maoist Centre) politicians
Nepalese atheists

Members of the 1st Nepalese Constituent Assembly